In United States law, a ministerial act is a government action "performed according to legal authority, established procedures or instructions from a superior, without exercising any individual judgment." It can be any act a functionary or bureaucrat performs in a prescribed manner, without exercising any individual judgment or discretion.  Under law, this would be classified under the rubric of public policy.

Examples of what is, and is not, ministerial 
Examples of ministerial acts include:
 the entry of an order of the court by a clerk of the court,
 notarization (acknowledgement) by a notary public,
 mechanical processing of an income tax return
 determining the existence of facts and applying them as required by law, without any discretion
 issuance of a building permit
approval of a subdivision real estate
 approval of a demolition permit
 a court's remand for "the correction of language in a judgment or the entry of a judgment in accordance with a mandate"

Actions that are not ministerial would include:
 a decision about application of a tax law, auditing of an income tax return, determining facts and applying law to those facts, and prioritizing such returns

Effects 
If a ministerial act is not performed, then a court may issue a writ of mandamus to compel the public official to perform said act.

Absolute or sovereign immunity does not apply to the performance or non-performance of ministerial acts.

References

See also 
 Government Law Center of Albany Law School
 Bureaucracy
 Common law
 Equity (law)
 Writs

United States administrative law
Legal procedure
American legal terminology